The Riau rupiah was a distinct currency of the Riau Archipelago between 1963 and 1964. It replaced the Malaya and British Borneo dollar at par and was replaced by the Indonesian rupiah at the rate of 1 Riau rupiah = 14.7 Indonesian rupiah.

History
Riau, though part of Dutch and Indonesian territory, was economically under the influence of neighbouring Malaya.  In order to affirm its fiscal stake in the region, a decree was passed on 15 October 1963 to replace the Malaya and British Borneo dollar (the circulating currency) with an Indonesian-issued currency, the Riau rupiah, which replaced the dollar at par. Although the Riau rupiah resembled the Indonesian rupiah in appearance, it had a much higher value. Malayan money was withdrawn from 1 November 1963. The Riau rupiah was exchangeable as a foreign currency with the Indonesian rupiah.

The Riau rupiah was much shorter lived than the West Irian rupiah (which circulated from May 1963 until 1971), and, by Presidential decree effective from 1 July 1964, the Riau rupiah was no longer a valid currency, being replaced by the Indonesian rupiah at a rate of 1 Riau rupiah = 14.7 Indonesian rupiah.

Coins
Coins were issued in denominations of 1, 5, 10, 25 and 50 sen. All were minted in aluminium and dated 1962. They bore the identifying inscription "Kepulauan Riau" on their edge (cf. West Irian rupiah#Coins).

Banknotes
Bank Indonesia notes were printed by Indonesian printer Pertjetakan Kebajoran dated "1960" with the overprint 'Riau' in denominations of 5, 10 and 100 rupiah, all carrying the image of President Sukarno but with colour and other design differences. Lower denomination notes, under Indonesian (and previously Netherlands Indies) law were the issuing privilege of the Indonesian government, and for Riau bore the date "1961" with the overprint "Riau", in 1 and 2 ½ rupiah denominations.

Identical notes, but for the overprint, were used for the West Irian rupiah in 1964. The five notes issued in Riau, the 5, 10, and 100 rupiah notes, minus the "Riau" overprint, plus the 1 and 2½ rupiah note designs, redated "1964", were then also used as Indonesian rupiah notes in 1965.

Green (1) and blue (2½) variants of the 1 and 2½ notes had also incidentally been printed, intended for issue in North Borneo, which Indonesia saw as a possible extension to its territory due to the power vacuum in the region at that time.

External links 

Modern obsolete currencies
Currencies of Indonesia
Economy of Indonesia
1963 establishments in Indonesia
1964 disestablishments in Indonesia
1960s economic history